Gal Cohen (born 14 August 1982) is a former Israeli footballer.

Cohen started his career in 2001, when he signed to Hapoel Petah Tikva. In 2006/2007, Cohen was loaned to Hapoel Nazareth Illit, after one year he backed to Petah Tikva and became the Captain.

In August 2011. he had transferred to Bnei Yehuda Tel Aviv.

External links

player profile on Hapoel Petah Tikva fan website 

1982 births
Living people
Israeli footballers
Footballers from Haifa District
Hapoel Petah Tikva F.C. players
Hapoel Nof HaGalil F.C. players
Bnei Yehuda Tel Aviv F.C. players
Hapoel Haifa F.C. players
Israeli Premier League players
Liga Leumit players
Israeli football managers
Hapoel Ra'anana A.F.C. managers
Association football defenders